Frederick Alan "Butch" Aikman DFC and Bar (5 March 1919 – 21 March 1991) was a Canadian World War II fighter pilot and flying ace with the Royal Air Force, credited with 9.5 victories.

Aikman was a clerk and ledger keeper and served as a sergeant in The Queen's Own Rifles of Canada before enlisting 6 November 1940. After graduation from flight training school on 13 September 1941, Aikman was posted overseas. He joined No. 154 Squadron RAF on 6 January 1942. The squadron moved to North Africa in January 1943, where Aikman achieved his victories before being hospitalized for malaria on 27 July. After the recuperation in Canada, Aikman was retrained to fly Dakotas and reposted overseas on 27 September 1944. Flying with No. 436 Squadron RCAF from 14 November 1944 to 23 September 1945, Aikman was returned to Canada 23 November 1945, and released from service 14 December 1945.

Aikman died in St. Catharines, Ontario, on 21 March 1991 at the age of 72.

Victories

References

1919 births
1991 deaths
Canadian aviators
Canadian World War II flying aces
Queen's Own Rifles of Canada soldiers
Royal Air Force personnel of World War II
Canadian Army personnel of World War II
Military personnel from Toronto
Royal Air Force personnel